Marie-Claude Doyon (born April 22, 1965) is a Canadian luger who competed in the late 1980s. She finished seventh in the women's singles event at the 1988 Winter Olympics in Calgary.

Claude-Doyon is married to Wolfgang Staudinger, coach of the Canadian luge team. They have a daughter born in 1999.

References
1988 luge women's singles results
Explorare.net profile 
Velocity magazine (Luge.ca) - July 2007

External links
 

1965 births
Canadian female lugers
Living people
Lugers at the 1988 Winter Olympics
Lugers at the 1992 Winter Olympics